Mohammadabad (also Romanized as Moḩammadābād) is a village in Neh Rural District, in the Central District of Nehbandan County, South Khorasan Province, Iran. At the 2006 census, its population was 110, in 26 families.

References 

Populated places in Nehbandan County